Mattia Casse (born 19 February 1990) is an Italian World Cup alpine ski racer. Born in Moncalieri in the Piedmont region of northwestern Italy, he specializes in the speed events (Downhill and Super-G) and has competed in four World Championships.

Career
The son of the ski racer and trainer Alessandro, Casse made his World Cup debut on 29 December 2009 in a downhill at Bormio, just missing out on points in 31st place. He scored his first World cup points later that season on 10 March, finishing 22nd in the Garmisch-Partenkirchen downhill.

Casse attained his first top ten result in December 2015 with a fourth place in the Super-G at Beaver Creek, just missing the podium; his first podium came in December 2022 on the Saslong, taking third in the second downhill of the week at Val Gardena.

World Cup results

Season standings

Race podiums
 0 wins
 3 podiums – (2 DH, 1 SG), 15 top tens

World Championship results

References

External links

Italian Winter Sports Federation – (FISI) – alpine skiing – Mattia Casse – 

1990 births
Italian male alpine skiers
Living people
People from Moncalieri
Sportspeople from the Metropolitan City of Turin